Inflatable sailing Ducky catamarans are a brand of foldable inflatable catamarans produced by Ukon-А Limited in Ukraine.

They are much lighter than similarly sized catamarans that use other construction.  In concept, they are "the yacht from backpack. Their main feature is mobility."

Models 
 Ducky 13 (1996) 
 Ducky 14s (2015) 
 Ducky 15 (1998) 
 Ducky 16 (2015) 
 Ducky 17 (2005) 
 Ducky 19 (2003)

See also 
 List of multihulls

References

External links 
 Ducky inflatable catamarans

Catamarans